Kem (Finnish and ) is a historic town and the administrative center of Kemsky District of the Republic of Karelia, Russia, located on the shores of the White Sea where the Kem River enters it, on the railroad leading from Petrozavodsk to Murmansk. It had a population of 13,051 as of 2010, which was down from previous years.

History

Kem was first mentioned as a demesne of the Novgorod posadnik Marfa Boretskaya in 1450, when she donated it to the Solovetsky Monastery (situated in the White Sea several kilometers off shore). In 1657, a wooden fort was erected there. Also wooden is the town's remarkable cathedral, built in 1711–1717. It is a fine example of the tented roof-construction so popular in old Russian architecture. The cathedral's iconostasis features precious 17th-century icons from Novgorod.

Town status was granted to Kem in 1785.

On April 10, 1918 the town was reached by Finnish troops during the Viena expedition in an attempt to join White Karelia to Finland.

In 1926–1939, Kem was used as departure place for boats headed to Solovetsky Islands carrying political prisoners. During the Cold War, the town was the site of the Poduzhemye air base, a key interceptor aircraft airfield covering Karelia.

Climate

Kem has a subarctic climate (Köppen climate classification: Dfc). It has a significant maritime influence compared with areas further east in the country with cool summers and less severe winters. The temperature regime has more in common with maritime areas on similar parallels in the Nordic countries to the west. It is some way above polar climate due to the milder summers with three months above  in mean temperature.

Administrative and municipal status
Within the framework of administrative divisions, Kem serves as the administrative center of Kemsky District, to which it is directly subordinated. As a municipal division, the town of Kem, together with three rural localities, is incorporated within Kemsky Municipal District as Kemskoye Urban Settlement.

In popular culture
Kem was the filming location for the 2006 film The Island.

References

Notes

Sources

External links

Official website of Kem 
Kem Business Directory 

Cities and towns in the Republic of Karelia
Kemsky District
Kemsky Uyezd
White Sea